The Pouch snake eel (Paraletharchus opercularis) is an eel in the family Ophichthidae (worm/snake eels). It was described by George S. Myers and Charles Barkley Wade in 1941, originally under the genus Letharchus. It is a marine, tropical eel which is known from the eastern central and southeastern Pacific Ocean, including the Galapagos Islands, the Revillagigedo Islands, and the Cocos Islands.

The IUCN redlist currently lists the pouch snake eel as vulnerable under Criterion D2, due to its limited range, and speculation that increasing frequency of ENSO events will have negative effects on the species' habitat.

References

Ophichthidae
Taxa named by George S. Myers
Taxa named by Charles Barkley Wade
Fish described in 1941